Viewpoint is a British police procedural drama thriller television miniseries created by Harry Bradbeer and Ed Whitmore and starring Noel Clarke and Alexandra Roach. Produced by Tiger Aspect Productions, it aired on ITV nightly from 26 April 2021, with the final episode premiering exclusively on ITV Hub and STV Player.

Premise 
Viewpoint follows a tense police surveillance investigation into a tight-knit Manchester community and explores whether it is ever possible to observe the lives of others with true objectivity and zero effect. Surveillance detective DC Martin Young (Noel Clarke) sets up his observation post in the home of single mum and secret voyeur Zoe Sterling (Alexandra Roach). Zoe’s windows command a panoramic view of Westbury Square, and more importantly provide a direct sightline into the home of missing primary-school teacher Gemma Hillman (Amy Wren) and her boyfriend - and prime suspect in her disappearance - Greg Sullivan (Fehinti Balogun).

Cast 

 Noel Clarke as DC Martin Young, a surveillance detective
 Alexandra Roach as Zoe Sterling, a single mother
 Amy Wren as Gemma Hillman, a missing primary school teacher
 Fehinti Balogun as Greg Sullivan, Gemma's boyfriend
 Bronagh Waugh as DC Stella Beckett 
 Marcus Garvey as DC Roly Dalton
 Phil Davis as DI Liam Cox
 Sarah Niles as DCI Jill Conroy
 Shannon Murray as Hayley Jones
 Ian Puleston-Davies as Donald Vernon
 Catherine Tyldesley as Kate Tuckman
 Dominic Allburn as Carl Tuckman
 Lucy Chambers as Chloe Tuckman
 Carlyss Peer as Sarah Young
 Erin Shanagher as Fiona Baker
 Sia Kiwa as Melissa
 Kíla Lord Cassidy as Caitlin Sterling

Episodes

Production and release 
ITV commissioned Viewpoint in January 2020. The show was set to begin filming in the Spring of 2020, but was cancelled due to the COVID-19 pandemic. Principal photography eventually began in August 2020 and was ITV's first drama series to begin shooting after the lockdowns which halted production. Filming took place at Space Studios in the city of Manchester and in other locations around the city, and finished in November 2020.

Viewpoint aired on ITV at 9pm across the final week of April 2021. The first episode was watched by 4.5 million overnight viewers, 26.3% of the total TV audience that evening. The first four episodes achieved an average of 3.8m viewers in overnight ratings; the fifth episode accrued at least 2.1m viewers via the ITV Hub.

Broadcast of Episode 5 
Prior to the fourth episode's broadcast on 29 April, The Guardian reported that Clarke was the subject of allegations of sexual harassment and intimidation by 20 women, which he denied. Although the episode aired as planned, the finale of Viewpoint was pulled from its intended broadcast on 30 April, and was replaced by a new episode of It'll Be Alright on the Night. The final episode was instead released onto ITV's on-demand platform, ITV Hub (and STV Player), alongside previous episodes, for 48 hours.  The episodes were streamed without advertisements.

International distribution of Viewpoint was also suspended.

References

External links

2020s British crime drama television series
2020s British police procedural television series
2021 British television series debuts
2021 British television series endings
British thriller television series
English-language television shows
ITV crime dramas
Television series about missing people
Television series by Tiger Aspect Productions
Television shows set in Manchester